Remaucourt may refer to the following places in France:

 Remaucourt, Aisne, a commune in the department of Aisne
 Remaucourt, Ardennes, a commune in the department of Ardennes